Saint Minas Church of New Julfa, (Armenian: ,), is an Armenian Apostolic church in New Julfa, Iran. It is located in Davrezh neighbourhood of New Julfa.

History 

Saint Minas Church was built in 1659, 4 years after relocation of Tabriz Armenians from Shamsabad, another neighbourhood of Isfahan.  They had built a St. Mary Church there and after relocating to New Julfa, the built this church named originally St. Mary. After devotion of relic of St. Minas to this church, it was renamed to St. Minas Church. There are some tombstones in the courtyard, two Georgians and a deputy British consul in Isfahan. A chapel was built in the church in 1713. The church was renovated in 1909.

See also
Iranian Armenians
List of Armenian churches in Iran

References 

Architecture in Iran
Churches in Isfahan
Armenian Apostolic churches in Iran
Oriental Orthodox congregations established in the 17th century
Tourist attractions in Isfahan
17th-century churches in Iran
1650s establishments in Iran